Kirsi Mykkänen (born 7 February 1978) is a Finnish sprinter. She competed in the women's 400 metres at the 2004 Summer Olympics.

References

1978 births
Living people
Athletes (track and field) at the 2004 Summer Olympics
Finnish female sprinters
Olympic athletes of Finland
Place of birth missing (living people)
Olympic female sprinters